Di You (born 26 November 1983) is a retired Chinese football midfielder.

Club career
Di You started his professional football career with top-tier Chinese club Bayi Football Team, a football team under the sport branch of the Chinese Army. With Bayi he would gradually establish himself as a squad player within the team; however, before he had a chance to further establish himself within the squad, the club were relegated at the end of the 2003 league season and decided to disband. Di would transfer to second-tier club Wuhan Optics Valley in 2004 where he was reunited with his former manager at Bayi, Pei Encai. Di's time in Wuhan would be extremely productive and he was not only part of the team that won the 2004 Chinese league one title and promotion to the Chinese Super League but was also part of the team that went on to win the 2005 Chinese Super League Cup as well.

Di's time at Wuhan would suddenly come to an abrupt end when the Wuhan management did not accept the punishment given to them by the Chinese Football Association after a scuffle broke out during a league game against Beijing Guoan on 27 September 2008 and the club quit the league for unfair punishment. Once again Di would have to find a new club to play for and joined second-tier football club Shanghai Zobon at the beginning of the 2009 league season. After a season with them Di had the chance to return to the top tier with Jiangsu Sainty as well as another reunion with Pei Encai, however after only a season at the club Di was allowed to leave. In 2011, he would join third-tier club Chongqing F.C. where he actually won promotion with them, however despite this he would leave the club to join another third-tier club in Shenzhen Fengpeng in 2012.

In March 2014, Di transferred to China League Two side Shenyang Dongjin.

On 1 July 2015, Di transferred to China League Two side Baoding Yingli ETS.

On October 13, 2018, Di You announced his retirement from professional football.

Honours
Wuhan Optics Valley
China League One: 2004
Chinese Super League Cup: 2005

References

External links
Di You's MicroBlog
Player stats at Sohu.com

1983 births
Living people
Sportspeople from Baoding
Chinese footballers
Footballers from Hebei
Bayi Football Team players
Wuhan Guanggu players
Jiangsu F.C. players
Pudong Zobon players
Shenyang Dongjin players
Inner Mongolia Zhongyou F.C. players
Baoding Yingli Yitong players
Chinese Super League players
China League One players
Association football midfielders
21st-century Chinese people